Baghati may refer to:
 anything of or related to Baghat, a region in Himachal Pradesh, India
 Baghati language, a language of Himachal Pradesh, India
 Baghati, Chanditala-I, a village in West Bengal, India
 Baghati, Pakistan, a village in Pakistan

Language and nationality disambiguation pages